Sirzar (also Romanized as Sīrzār; also known as Mīrzār) is a village in Kabud Gonbad Rural District, in the Central District of Kalat County, Razavi Khorasan Province, Iran. At the 2006 census, its population was 711, in 165 families.

References 

Populated places in Kalat County